Sergei Dmitriyevich Bogdanov (born 11 March 1977) is a former Russian professional footballer.

Honours
 Kazakhstan Premier League runner-up: 2003.
 Russian Second Division Zone East top scorer: 1998 (13 goals).

External links
 

1977 births
Living people
Russian footballers
Association football forwards
FC Kuban Krasnodar players
FC Lada-Tolyatti players
FC Elista players
FC Tobol players
FC Gornyak Uchaly players
FC Vitebsk players
FC Slavyansk Slavyansk-na-Kubani players
FC Yenisey Krasnoyarsk players
FC Dynamo Vologda players
FC Spartak-UGP Anapa players
Kazakhstan Premier League players
Belarusian Premier League players
Russian expatriate footballers
Russian expatriate sportspeople in Kazakhstan
Expatriate footballers in Kazakhstan
Expatriate footballers in Belarus
FC Amur Blagoveshchensk players